Mansfield 66/67 is a 2017 documentary musical directed by P. David Ebersole and Todd Hughes about the last two years of actress Jayne Mansfield's life. The film examines the rumors surrounding Mansfield's untimely death, and relationship with Anton LaVey as a celebration of Mansfield's life on the 50th anniversary of her death.

Background
Mansfield 66/67 was conceived when writers P. David Ebersole & Todd Hughes couldn't get their narrative The Devil Made Her Do It produced, and instead decided to present their Mansfield/LaVey story as a documentary. More than 100 students and staff from Leeds Beckett University worked with the filmmakers to bring the film to life, inviting Ben Wilkins to re-mix the film in Leeds as a Master Class.

The film was released theatrically in North America for Halloween 2017, and in the UK in April 2018.

Synopsis
Mansfield 66/67 is largely made up of modern day interviews with celebrities, historians, & psychologists, interspersed with scenes from Mansfield's library of work, performance art by students working on the film, and animations. It summarizes the career of actress Jayne Mansfield, spending the bulk of the film detailing her relationship with Anton LaVey, the Church of Satan, and the 2 years leading up to her death in 1967.

The film's soundtrack was released in 2017 by The Ebersole Hughes Company Records and Tapes featuring: Robert Davis, James Peter Moffatt, Donna Loren, The 5.6.7.8's, The Wayfarers, Ann Magnuson, White Rabbit Club, Mikey Silverman, Larra Anderson, and Maurice Gainen.

Cast

 Kenneth Anger 
 Richmond Arquette 
 A. J. Benza 
 Susan Bernard 
 Peaches Christ 
 Cheryl Dunye 
 Tippi Hedren 
 Anton LaVey (archival footage)
 Jayne Mansfield (archival footage)
 Ann Magnuson 
 Marilyn (singer) 
 Alison Martino 
 Matt Momchilov 
 Dolly Read 
 Yolonda Ross 
 Mamie Van Doren 
 John Waters 
 Mary Woronov 
 Dr. Barbara Hahn
 Dr. Eileen Jones
 Dr. Eve Oishi
 Dr. Jane Alexander Stewart
 Sandy Balzar
 Miguel Pendas
 Dawn Patricia Robinson
 Edenamiuki Aiguobasinmwin
 Samuel S. Brody (archival footage)
 Cary Grant (archival footage)

References

External links
 IMDB Entry
 Mansfield 66/67 Official Site
 Peccadillo Pictures

2017 films
2017 documentary films
2017 musical films
2010s British animated films
American animated musical films
British musical films
Documentary films about actors
Jayne Mansfield
2010s English-language films
Films directed by P. David Ebersole
2010s American films
2010s British films